Pramila S Bhatt (née Korikar) (born 16 September 1969, in Bangalore, Karnataka) is a former Indian cricketer.

Career 
She played Women's Test cricket (5 matches between 1991 and 1996) and ODI cricket for India (22 matches between 1993 and 1998). She captained the Indian team in 1 Test match and 7 ODI matches. An all-rounder, she played most of her ODI innings in the middle order and bowled right arm offspin. Her tenure as captain is best remembered for the tied-ODI match against New Zealand in the 1997/98 Women's Cricket World Cup.

Personal life 
She currently lives in Abu Dhabi with her husband, Sarangan Venugopalan and her two sons, Siddanth and Sanjith.

References

1969 births
Living people
India women One Day International cricketers
India women Test cricketers
Indian women cricketers
Cricketers from Bangalore
Sportswomen from Karnataka
Air India women cricketers
Indian women cricket captains